= There is a pain — so utter — =

Poem by Emily Dickinson

"There is a pain — so utter —" is a poem written by American poet Emily Dickinson. Dickinson's poems were not published until after she died. Dickinson grew up in Amherst, Massachusetts where her father did not support women in publishing and believed that literature could negatively alter the human mind. Dickinson's poems are not titled and therefore are recognized after the first line. Like many of Dickinson's poems, "There is a pain — so utter—" was substantially changed when it was first published in 1929. The original version, with Dickinson's typical dashes, was restored by scholar Thomas H. Johnson for his 1955 edition of The Poems of Emily Dickinson.

== Text ==
There is a pain — so utter —
It swallows substance up —
Then covers the Abyss with Trance —
So Memory can step
Around — across — opon [sic] it —
As One within a Swoon —
Goes safely — where an open eye —
Would drop Him — Bone by Bone —

== Interpretation ==
Pain is a recurring theme in Dickinson's poetry. This poem describes an altered state of mind: "trance" (line 3) and "swoon" (line 6). The pain described within this poem suggests that the human mind is often numb which affects the state of memory. Memory in this poem is discussed delicately, yet Dickinson's diction allows for this poem to create a deep realm that contrasts pain and memory through the pronoun of "Him" (line 8). Selective words such as "cover the Abyss" (line 3) lead scholars to believe that Dickinson is personifying memory himself.
